Chahar Bisheh (also Romanized as Chahār Bīsheh; also known as Chahar Bisheh Janbe Masjed Soleiman) is a village in Tombi Golgir Rural District, Golgir District, Masjed Soleyman County, Khuzestan Province, Iran. At the 2006 census, its population was 238, in 43 families.

References 

Populated places in Masjed Soleyman County